Große EWE Arena, or Grosse EWE Arena, (English: Large EWE Arena) is a dual indoor sporting arena complex in Oldenburg, Germany. It is a part of the Weser-Ems Halle multi-sporting complex, which contains two main sports arena halls, the small Kleine EWE Arena, and the large Große EWE Arena. The facility's name comes from a sponsorship arrangement with the German energy and telecommunications company .

The Große EWE arena has a seating capacity of 8,000 for concerts, 7,396 for boxing matches, 6,069 for basketball games, 5,532 for handball games, and 4,228 for equestrian competitions.

It is the home arena of the professional basketball team EWE Baskets Oldenburg, of the German League.

References

External links
Official Website Große EWE Arena 
Große EWE Arena Official Website 
Große EWE Arena Picture

2013 establishments in Germany
Sports venues completed in 2013
Indoor arenas in Germany
Basketball venues in Germany
Buildings and structures in Oldenburg (city)
Tourist attractions in Oldenburg (city)
Sports venues in Lower Saxony
Sport in Oldenburg (city)
VfL Oldenburg

de:EWE Arena#Große EWE Arena